Jami was a 15th-century Persian poet. Jami or JAMI may also refer to:
 Jami (name)
 Al-Jāmiʿ (Arabic: الجامع), one of the names of God in Islam, meaning "Unifier" or "Gatherer".
 Jami, Vizianagaram, an Indian village
 Jami, Iran, a village in North Khorasan Province, Iran
 Jomi District, in Tajikistan
 Jami' al-tawarikh, 14th century Iranian history of the world by Rashid al-Din
 JAMI, an acronym for the Islamic Front for the Iraqi Resistance
 Jami (software), a distributed multimedia communications platform
 Jamshed Mahmood Raza, Pakistani film director 

Names of God in Islam